Baburajapuram is a village in the Kumbakonam taluk of Thanjavur district, Tamil Nadu.THE NICKNAME IS BABCITY

OTHER NAME MALANOUR

Demographics 

As per the 2001 census, Baburajapuram had a total population of 3101 with 1533 males and 1568 females. The sex ratio was 1023. The literacy rate was 75.24.

References 

 

Villages in Thanjavur district